The Nördlinger Ries is an impact crater and large circular depression in western Bavaria and eastern Baden-Württemberg. It is located north of the Danube in the district of Donau-Ries.

Etymology 
"Ries" is derived from Raetia, since the tribe of Raetians lived in the area in pre-Roman times.

Description 

The depression is a meteorite impact crater formed 14.808 ± 0.038 million years ago in the Miocene. The crater is most commonly referred to simply as Ries crater or the Ries.

It was originally assumed that the Ries was of volcanic origin. In 1960 Eugene Shoemaker and Edward C. T. Chao showed that the depression was caused by meteorite impact. The key evidence was the presence of coesite, which, in unmetamorphosed rocks, can only be formed by the shock pressures associated with meteorite impact. The coesite was found in suevite from Otting quarry, but even before, Shoemaker was encouraged by St. George's Church in Nördlingen, which is built of locally derived suevite. The suevite was formed from mesozoic sediments shocked by the bolide impact.

The Ries impact crater was a rampart crater, thus far a unique finding on Earth. Rampart craters have almost exclusively been found on Mars. Rampart craters exhibit a fluidized ejecta flow after impact of the meteorite, most simply compared to a bullet fired into mud, with the ejecta resembling a mudflow.

It had previously been thought that the two craters formed simultaneously by the impact of a binary asteroid 14.8 million years ago, but a study published in 2020 suggests that Steinheim could actually be about 500,000 years younger than Nördlinger Ries.

The resulting explosion had the power of 1.8 million Hiroshima bombs, an energy of roughly 2.4 joules.

The Ries crater impact event is believed to be the source of moldavite tektites found in Bohemia and Moravia (Czech Republic). The tektite melt originated from a sand-rich surface layer that was ejected to distances up to  downrange of the crater. The shape of the strewnfield suggests that the direction of impact was from the west-southwest.

The impact that caused the Nördlinger Ries crater created an estimated  of them when it impacted a local graphite deposit. Stone from this area was quarried and used to build the local buildings.

Archaeology 
On one edge of the Nördlinger Ries are the Ofnet Caves, where, at the beginning of the 20th century, archaeologists discovered thirty-three human skulls dating to the Mesolithic period.

Astronaut training 
The landing site for Apollo 14 is a heavily craterized terrain, and one of the science goals of the mission was to sample ejecta from the impact that formed Mare Imbrium. Nördlinger Ries is an easily accessible, large impact crater, making it a convenient analog for lunar craters. Because of this, it was used as a location to train Apollo 14 astronauts, so that they would be able to investigate lunar impact structures and related rocks. Astronauts Alan Shepard and Edgar Mitchell, as well as Apollo 14 backup astronauts Eugene Cernan and Joe Engle, trained here from August 10 to August 14, 1970.

References

External links 

 Ries at Earth Impact Database
 Travel for Kids: Nordlingen, Germany
 Information on meteorite and aerial photo of town, scroll two thirds of the way down page

Impact craters of Germany
Miocene impact craters
Neogene Germany
Paleontological sites of Europe
Landforms of Bavaria
Landforms of Baden-Württemberg
Natural regions of the Swabian Keuper-Lias Plains
Geological type localities
Donau-Ries